A victory column, or monumental column or triumphal column, is a monument in the form of a column, erected in memory of a victorious battle, war, or revolution. The column typically stands on a base and is crowned with a victory symbol, such as a statue. The statue may represent the goddess Victoria; in Germany, the female embodiment of the nation, Germania; in the United States either female embodiment of the nation Liberty or Columbia; in the United Kingdom, the female embodiment Britannia, an eagle, or a war hero.

Monumental columns

List of Roman victory columns
Of the columns listed above, the following are the Roman columns. Roman triumphal columns were either monolithic pillars or composed of column drums; in the later case, these were often hollowed out to accommodate an ancient spiral staircase leading up to the platform on top.

The earliest triumphal column was Trajan's Column which, dedicated in 113 AD, defined its architectural form and established its symbolic value as a political monument alongside the older Roman triumphal arches, providing a lingering model for its successors to this day. The imperial capitals of Rome and Constantinople house the most ancient triumphal columns.

All dimensions are given here in metres, though it was the Roman foot by which ancient architects determined the harmonious proportions of the columns, and which is thus crucial for understanding their design. The list is sorted by date of erection.

See also 
 Record-holding columns in antiquity
 List of Roman obelisks
 List of Roman spiral stairs
 List of Roman triumphal arches
 Iaat, near Baalbek, Lebanon
 Obelisk
 Rostral column
 Triumphal arch

References

Bibliography 
Part of this page is based on the article Siegessäule in the German-language Wikipedia.

Further reading

External links 

 

Victory column
Victory columns
Roman victory columns
Stone monuments and memorials

Types of monuments and memorials